Kiten may refer to:

 Kiten, Burgas Province, a resort town on the Bulgarian Black Sea Coast
 Kiten, Varna Province, a village in Varna Province, Bulgaria
 Kiten (program), a Japanese Kanji learning tool